Thomas Chalers or Deschalers (17 September 1383 – 1443), of Whaddon, Cambridgeshire and Wyddial, Hertfordshire, was an English politician.

Family
Chalers was the son and heir of the MP, Sir John Chalers. He married at some point before May 1407, a woman named Margaret. They had one son, Sir John Chalers, also an MP.

Career
He was a Member (MP) of the Parliament of England for Cambridgeshire in 1417 and was selected High Sheriff of Cambridgeshire and Huntingdonshire for 1426–27.

References

1383 births
1443 deaths
English MPs 1417
People from South Cambridgeshire District
People from East Hertfordshire District
High Sheriffs of Cambridgeshire and Huntingdonshire